Eagles East: The Army Air Forces and the Soviet Union, 1941–1945 is a 1970 book by Richard C. Lukas. It is a military-diplomatic study focusing on the World War II relations between the United States Army Air Forces and the USSR.

Based on Lukas' doctoral dissertation, earned him the national history award of the American Institute of Aeronautics and Astronautics.

R.S.Hughes commended the book for its "extensive and detailed coverage of Allied-Soviet relations during World War II", and noted that it is particularly helpful for its discussion of the Lend-Lease program. Raymond L. Garthoff writes that it is a "useful study" and "recommended reading" for those interested in the political-military history of USA-USSR relations during World War II with regard to interactions between the U.S. Army Air Forces and the USSR. 

James J. Hudson calls the book "an excellent example of military-diplomatic history". Sam Frank, in his review, writes that the book "reflects extensive research and effective writing. An excellent balance has been achieved between factual presentation and interpretation."

See also 
Operation Frantic

References

1970 books
Non-fiction books about military history of the United States
History books about the Soviet Union
Soviet Union–United States relations
20th-century history of the United States Air Force
Books by Richard C. Lukas
History books about World War II